Warren Lake is a lake in Mahnomen County, in the U.S. state of Minnesota.

Warren Lake was named for Budd Warren, the nephew of William Whipple Warren, an historian, interpreter, and legislator in the Minnesota Territory.

References

Lakes of Minnesota
Lakes of Mahnomen County, Minnesota